If All Now Here is the debut full-length album from the American electronic/synthpop act Feathers.  It was released in CD and digital formats on May 28, 2013.

Reception
Advance reviews of If All Now Here have been strongly positive, with Bust Magazine giving it a 4/5 rating.

Clash Magazine named Feathers "One to Watch," adding "‘If All Now Here’ has an epic atmosphere, thriving on huge moments, lavish textures and massive choruses."

UK blog The VPME gave it a 9/10 rating, noting "if like us you like dark, intelligent pop music with an undercurrent of mystical eastern allure performed by, let’s face it, a band who would give Cleopatra a run for her money, then Feathers are the band for you. Definitely an early album of the year contender!"

"Anastasia Dimou delivers tunes that are melodic, mysterious and often mesmerising"- NME

"This is music designed to overpower and enthral. Sonically, it’s extremely impressive, and almost every song sounds massive." - thisisfakeDIY.co.uk

Track listing

References

2013 albums